The Most Distinguished Royal Family Order of Terengganu (Bahasa Melayu: Darjah Kerabat Diraja Terengganu Yang Amat Mulia) is an honorific order of the Sultanate of Terengganu, who is the constitutional head of Terengganu state in Malaysia.

History 
It was founded by Sultan Mizan Zainal Abidin of Terengganu on 6 July 2000 as a family order for members of the Terengganu and other Royal houses.

Classes 
It is awarded in one class: 
 Member (Ahli) - D.K.R.

Recipients
 Tengku Muhammad Ismail
 King Rama IX of Thailand
 Queen Sirikit of Thailand

References 

Royal Family Order